The 2014 European Parliament election in Lithuania was an election of the delegation from Lithuania to the European Parliament in 2014. It was part of the wider 2014 European election.

Background

In 2013, Elections to the European Parliament Act introduced public election committees. Prior to these elections, only two public election committees collected signatures, but none of them collected enough signatures to be registered and take part in elections.

Results

Analysis
Although opinion polls and pundits claimed for large Social Democratic Party victory, but elections were won by the Homeland Union by around 2,000 votes.

The Homeland Union won only in six municipalities (including Vilnius and Kaunas). The Social Democratic Party came at close second by the number of votes. The Liberal Movement 
came third, but it won in two municipalities only (Klaipėda and Neringa). The Order and Justice mainly won in northwest of the country.

See also
MEPs for Lithuania 2014–2019
Members of the European Parliament 2014–2019

References

Lithuania
European Parliament elections in Lithuania
European